The Ministry of Environment Water and Agriculture (MEWA), is a government ministry in Saudi Arabia responsible for the achievement of sustainability of the environment and natural resources in the Kingdom. The ministry also is in charge of developing and applying policies that contribute to achieving water and food security. The current Minister is Abdulrahman Al-Fadli who was appointed as the Minister of Agriculture on 15 January 2015 and kept his position after the amending the name of the Ministry to the Ministry of Environment, Water and Agriculture in May 2016.

History
In 1947, the directorate general for Agriculture was established under the Ministry of Finance, and was assigned the responsibilities of agriculture such as improving lands and irrigation and building dams. This entity was later transformed into the Ministry of Agriculture and Water in 1953 and Sultan bin Abdulaziz Al Saud was appointed the Minister of Agriculture in 1953. His tenure lasted until 1955. In 2002, the water sector was separated from the ministry and became the Ministry of Agriculture. However, in 2016, the name of the Ministry of Agriculture was amended again to the Ministry of Environment, Water, and Agriculture.

Objectives 
The ministry has objectives regarding the environment water and agriculture. These objectives include the development and preservation of the environment and natural resources. And also the achievement of the water and food security.

Deputy Ministries 

 Directorate of Environment.
 Directorate of Water.
 Directorate of Agriculture.
 Directorate of Land & Survey.
 Directorate of Animal Resources.
 Directorate of Planning & Budget.
 Directorate of Shared Services.
 Directorate of Economic Affairs and Investment.

Departments 
 Plant Health Department

References 

Environment
Saudi
Organizations established in 1953